The Togo women's national basketball team represents Togo in international competitions. It is administered by the Fédération Nationale de Basketball Togo (FTBB).

References

External links
Official website of the Togolese Basketball Federation

 
Women's national basketball teams